Philip J. Rasch (1909–1995) was a physiologist, a writer of Western history and the author of several publications, notably about Billy the Kid, and the Lincoln County War.

Career

Philip John Rasch was born December 3, 1909, in Grand Rapids, Michigan, and 
served in the U. S. Navy on a submarine chaser in the Pacific during World War II.  The extensive detail of Rasch's early research of the Old West, can be found in his 1948 article: Red Hair and Outlawry

Publications

 Red hair and outlawry, by Philip J. Rasch; Hans von Hentig, 1947
 New Light on the Legend of Billy the Kid, New Mexico Folklore Record, 6 (1953), 1-5. Philip J. Rasch and Robert N. Mullin.
 Dim Trails: The Pursuit of the McCarty Family, New Mexico Folklore Record, 8 (1954), 6-11.  Philip J. Rasch and Robert N. Mullin.
 The rise of the house of Murphy, by Philip J. Rasch, 1956
 Feuding at Farmington, by Philip J. Rasch, 1965
 An incomplete account of "Bronco Bill" Walters, by Philip J. Rasch, 1977
 Kinesiology and applied anatomy, by Philip J. Rasch, 1989
 Trailing Billy the Kid, by Philip J. Rasch; Robert K. DeArment, 1995
 Gunsmoke in Lincoln County, by Philip J. Rasch; Robert K. DeArment, 1997
 Warriors of Lincoln County, by Philip J. Rasch; Robert K. DeArment, 1998
 Desperadoes of Arizona Territory, by Philip J. Rasch; Robert K. DeArment, 1999
 A note on Buckskin Frank Leslie, by Philip J. Rasch, not dated

References

External links
 Philip J. Rasch at New Mexico History Museum, Santa Fe, New Mexico
 Worldcat Overview & works, Philip J. Rasch
 

1909 births
1995 deaths